The Commission on Accreditation for Law Enforcement Agencies, Inc. (CALEA) is a credentialing authority (accreditation), based in the United States, whose primary mission is to accredit public safety agencies, namely law enforcement agencies, training academies, communications centers, and campus public safety agencies.

Creation
The Commission was created in 1979 as an independent accrediting authority by the four major law enforcement membership associations:

International Association of Chiefs of Police (IACP)
National Organization of Black Law Enforcement Executives (NOBLE)
National Sheriffs' Association (NSA)
Police Executive Research Forum (PERF)

Purpose and authority of the Commission
The primary purpose of the Commission is to improve law enforcement service by creating a national body of standards developed by law enforcement professionals. Furthermore, it recognizes professional achievements by establishing and administering an accreditation process through which a law enforcement agency can demonstrate that it meets those standards.  CALEA derives its general authority from the four major law enforcement membership associations whose members represent approximately 80% of the law enforcement profession in the United States.

Commissioners
Members to the Commission are appointed by the Executive Directors of these four associations. A majority vote is required for each appointment. Commissioners are appointed to a term of three years.

The Commission is composed of 21 members:
11 members are selected from law enforcement
10 members are selected from the public and private sectors.

CALEA Accreditation Programs

Law Enforcement
The Law Enforcement Accreditation Program was the first credentialing program established by CALEA after its founding. It was originally developed to address what was seen as a need to enhance law enforcement as a profession and to improve law enforcement service delivery. That mission continues today through a tiered law enforcement accreditation program. Participating agencies may enroll in either CALEA Law Enforcement Accreditation or CALEA Advanced Law Enforcement Accreditation, without regard to agency size.  Agencies may apply for and be awarded Accreditation with Excellence by the Commission as an indication of superlative performance within these accreditation programs.

Additionally, these programs are open to all types of law enforcement agencies, on an international basis. And, these programs provide specific standards to support law enforcement agencies functioning in the college/university environment. They provide a process to systematically conduct an internal review and assessment of the agencies’ policies and procedures, and make adjustments wherever necessary to meet a body of internationally accepted standards.

Since the first CALEA Accreditation Award was granted in 1984, the program has become the primary method for an agency to voluntarily demonstrate their commitment to excellence in law enforcement. The standards upon which the Law Enforcement Accreditation Program is based reflect the current thinking and experience of law enforcement practitioners and researchers. Major law enforcement associations, leading educational and training institutions, governmental agencies, as well as law enforcement executives internationally, acknowledge CALEA's Standards for Law Enforcement Agencies© and its Accreditation Programs as benchmarks for professional law enforcement agencies.

CALEA Accreditation requires an agency to develop a comprehensive, well-thought-out, uniform set of written directives. This is one of the most successful methods for reaching administrative and operational goals, while also providing direction to personnel.
CALEA Accreditation standards provide the necessary reports and analyses a CEO needs to make fact-based, informed management decisions.
CALEA Accreditation requires a preparedness program be put in place—so an agency is ready to address natural or man-made unusual occurrences.
CALEA Accreditation is a means for developing or improving upon an agency's relationship with the community.
CALEA Accreditation strengthens an agency's accountability, both within the agency and the community, through a continuum of standards that clearly define authority, performance, and responsibilities.
Being CALEA Accredited can limit an agency's liability and risk exposure because it demonstrates that internationally recognized standards for law enforcement have been met, as verified by a team of independent outside CALEA-trained assessors.
CALEA Accreditation facilitates an agency's pursuit of professional excellence.
The California Highway Patrol is the largest law enforcement agency within the United States to obtain CALEA Accreditation.

Public Safety Communications
The CALEA Public Safety Communications Accreditation Program provides a communications center, or the communications unit of a public safety agency, with a process to systemically review and internally assess its operations and procedures. Since the first CALEA Communication Accreditation Award was granted in 1999, the program has become the primary method for a communications agency to voluntarily demonstrate its commitment to excellence. The standards upon which the Public Safety Communications Accreditation Program is based reflect the current thinking and experience of public safety communications executives and accreditation experts. APCO International (Association of Public-Safety Communications Officials International, Inc.), the leading communications membership association, was a partner in the development of CALEA's Standards for Public Safety Communications Agencies© and its Accreditation Program. This relationship continues today as APCO recognizes the achievements of CALEA Accredited Public Safety Communications agencies and supports accreditation.

CALEA Accreditation requires the communications center or unit to develop a comprehensive, well thought out uniform set of written directives. This is one of the most successful methods for reaching administrative and operational goals, while also providing direction to personnel.

CALEA Accreditation standards provide the necessary reports and analyses a CEO needs to make fact-based, informed management decisions.
CALEA Accreditation requires a preparedness program be put in place—so a communications center is ready to address natural or man-made unusual occurrences.
CALEA Accreditation is a means for developing or improving upon a communications center's relationship with the community or the agencies it services.
CALEA Accreditation strengthens an agency's accountability, both within the agency and the community, through a continuum of standards that clearly define authority, performance, and responsibilities.
Being CALEA Accredited can limit a communications center's liability and risk exposure because it demonstrates that internationally recognized standards for public safety communications have been met, as verified by a team of independent outside CALEA-trained assessors.
CALEA Accreditation facilitates an agency's pursuit of professional excellence.

Public Safety Training Academy 
The Public Safety Training Academy Accreditation Program began in 2002. Its purpose is to promote superior public safety training services and recognize professional excellence. The program's standards are derived from the best practices of professional public safety training academies, and do not conflict with any organizations that are recognized training authorities. The standards prescribe "what" academies should be doing, but not "how" they should do it. That decision is left up to each academy and the Chief Executive Officer.

The program standards cover nine topic areas: (1) credentialing; (2) organization; (3) direction and authority; (4) human resources; (5) recruitment, selection, employment, and promotion; (6) instructional systems; (7) training administration; (8) instructors; and (9) students.

The CALEA Accreditation Process is a proven modern management model; once implemented, it presents the CEO, on a continuing basis, with a blueprint that promotes the efficient use of resources and improves service delivery—regardless of the size, type, or geographic location of the academy.

The standards upon which the Public Safety Training Academy Accreditation Program is based reflect the current thinking and experience of training academy practitioners and accreditation experts. CALEA's Standards for Public Safety Training Academies© and its Accreditation Program are seen as benchmarks for today's public safety training programs.

CALEA Accreditation requires an academy to develop a comprehensive, well thought out, uniform set of written directives. This is one of the most successful methods for reaching administrative and operational goals, while also providing direction to personnel.
CALEA Accreditation standards provide the necessary reports and analyses a CEO needs to make fact-based, informed management and administrative decisions.
CALEA Accreditation is a means for developing or improving upon an academy's relationship with the community it serves.
CALEA Accreditation strengthens an academy's accountability through a continuum of standards that clearly define authority, performance, and responsibilities.
Being CALEA Accredited can limit an academy's liability and risk exposure because it demonstrates that recognized standards for public safety training academies have been met, as verified by a team of independent outside CALEA-trained assessors.
CALEA Accreditation facilitates an academy's pursuit of professional excellence.

Campus Security
The CALEA Campus Security Accreditation Program is designed for educational campus security agencies or departments that primarily employ non-sworn security officers and identify themselves as a "campus security force."

Eligible campus security agencies are defined as those having legal authority to perform security and public safety related functions in an educational campus-based setting, or those providing security or public safety services whose eligibility is verified by the Commission.

The CALEA Accreditation Process is a proven modern management model; once implemented, it presents the Chief Executive Officer (CEO), on a continuing basis, with a blueprint that promotes the efficient use of resources and improves service delivery - regardless of the size, geographic location, or functional responsibilities of the agency.

The CALEA Campus Security Accreditation Program provides agencies an opportunity to voluntarily demonstrate that they meet an established set of professional standards which:

Require the agency to develop a comprehensive, well thought out, uniform set of written directives. This is one of the most successful steps for reaching administrative and operational goals, while also providing direction to personnel.
Provide the necessary reports and analyses a CEO needs to make fact-based, informed management decisions.
Require a preparedness program be put in place - so an agency is ready to address natural or man-made critical incidents.
Are a means for developing or improving upon an agency's relationship with the campus community.
Strengthen the agency's accountability, both within the agency and the campus community, through a continuum of standards that clearly define authority, performance, and responsibilities.
Can limit an agency's liability and risk exposure because it demonstrates that internationally recognized standards for campus security have been met, as verified by a team of independent outside CALEA-trained assessors.
Facilitates an agency's pursuit of professional excellence.

CALEA Awards
CALEA offers several awards of recognition and achievement.

Egon Bittner Award
The Egon Bittner Award is presented to Chief Executive Officers who have commanded a CALEA Accredited agency for fifteen or more continuous years.

James V. Cotter Award
The James V. Cotter Award is for Chief Executive Officers who have successfully brought three or more new agencies into CALEA Accredited status.

Meritorious Award
CALEA Accredited Agencies are recognized for having been CALEA Accredited for 15 or more continuous years.

Tri-Arc Award
The Tri-Arc Award is given to the governing body(s) and agencies that have concurrent CALEA accreditation for their law enforcement, public safety communications and public safety training agencies.

CALEA Assessors
CALEA Assessors are contractual employees who follow the policies and procedures of the Commission.  CALEA Assessors must have the ability to evaluate public safety management policies, procedures, practices, and activities.  It is important for an assessor to have a firm understanding of modern public safety personnel, administrative, legal, and operational concepts and be able to interact, at a peer level, with the assessed agency CEO and command staff.

While on assignment, CALEA Assessors must exemplify the highest levels of professionalism at all times and foster a non-adversarial climate.  The CALEA Philosophy concerning assessments is "accountability with reasonable assistance."  As the "eyes and ears" of the Commission, assessors must maintain objectivity and report on the agency's ability to comply with the requisite number of applicable standards.

For every accreditation on-site assessment, one assessor is designated as the team leader.  Team leaders must hold a senior level executive or management position in their agency.  Team leaders are selected from the assessor pool based on their performance, the recommendations of their past team leaders and assessed agencies, and a CALEA Staff review.  Team leader certification requires additional CALEA training, as well as maintaining an active assessor certificate.  Re-certification is required every three years for assessor and team leader.

Assessor Qualifications
CALEA maintains a pool of assessors that represents the demographics of the agencies it serves. CALEA Assessors must have:

A minimum of a baccalaureate degree or equivalent work experience and education.
Five years of current full-time public safety experience as:
a first-line supervisor or higher, or 
a high-level administrative experience that requires considerable use of discretion.

Five years of CALEA accreditation experience.
The ability to write a high quality professional report.

Accreditation Support Networks (PAC)
Local assistance and in-house support with CALEA Accreditation Programs are provided by a network of organizations called Police Accreditation Coalitions, or PAC for short.  PACs are formed on a local (state) or regional (multi-state) basis and made up of experienced Accreditation Managers.  New accreditation managers can join their local PAC for training, guidance, and support at the local level.  For other assistance or for areas where there is no local PAC accreditation managers can join the CALEA PAC Network.

List of Current Police Accreditation Coalitions

Some of the other core Missions of the CALEA PAC Network include assisting CALEA Accreditation Managers by providing:

A database of reference model policies and directives.
A database of approved accreditation files for reference.
A database of model forms.
A database of training material to support training requirements for the standards.
An interactive forum for Accreditation Managers to discuss issues, standards, and compliance.

See also
Florida Criminal Justice Standards & Training Commission

Sources
The Commission on Accreditation for Law Enforcement Agencies (CALEA)

External links
The Commission on Accreditation for Law Enforcement Agencies (CALEA)

1979 establishments in the United States
Law enforcement non-governmental organizations in the United States
Organizations established in 1979
Organizations based in Virginia